Pulley is a small village on the southern edge of Shrewsbury in Shropshire, England. It is located between Shrewsbury and Bayston Hill. The population at the 2011 Census is listed under Bayston Hill. The A5 Shrewsbury by-pass cuts through the area.

To the north is the Shrewsbury suburb of Meole Brace.

See also
Listed buildings in Bayston Hill

History
The modern placename of "Pulley" is listed in Folio 259r, and 260v, in the Domesday Book (c.1086) at the UK National Archives and was then spelled as "Polelie".

External links

Villages in Shropshire